The Pact of San Sebastián was a meeting led by Niceto Alcalá Zamora and Miguel Maura, which took place in San Sebastián, Spain on 17 August 1930. Representatives from practically all republican political movements in Spain at the time attended the meeting. Presided over by Fernando Sasiaín (representative of the Unión Republicana), the attendees included:

- for the Radical Republican Party:  Alejandro Lerroux;
- for Acción Republicana:  Manuel Azaña;
- for the Partido Radical Socialista:  Marcelino Domingo, Álvaro de Albornoz and Ángel Galarza;
- for the Derecha Liberal Republicana:  Niceto Alcalá Zamora and Miguel Maura;
- for Acció Catalana:  Manuel Carrasco Formiguera;
- for Acció Republicana de Catalunya:  Matías Mallol Bosch;
- for the Estat Català:  Jaume Aiguader;
- for the Organización Republicana Gallega Autónoma:  Santiago Casares Quiroga;
- in their own right: Indalecio Prieto, Felipe Sánchez Román, Fernando de los Ríos, and Eduardo Ortega y Gasset, brother of philosopher José Ortega y Gasset. Gregorio Marañón was not able to attend, but sent a letter associating himself with the group.

At the meeting, a "revolutionary committee" was formed, headed by Alcalá-Zamora; this committee eventually became the first provisional government of the Second Spanish Republic. The committee was in close contact with a group of soldiers, with the intent of bringing about a military coup in favor of a republic. The coup was set for 15 December 1930. Nonetheless, Captain Fermín Galán attempted to start the uprising on 12 December, which resulted in the failure of the coup. Galán and Captain Ángel García Hernández were executed by a firing squad.

References

 This article draws heavily on the corresponding article in the Spanish-language Wikipedia.

1930 in Spain
Second Spanish Republic
1930 conferences